Macomades was a Carthaginian and Roman city in North Africa. It was located near present-day Oum-El-Bouaghi, Algeria

History 

Macomades was established as an inland Punic trading post under the name  ("Place"). It issued its own bronze coins with an Egyptian-style god's head obverse and a reverse bearing either a hog and galloping horse or a disk in a crescent, a symbol of the Punic goddess Tanit.

It was a town in the Roman province of Numidia.

It was overrun by the Umayyad Caliphate during the 7th-century Muslim invasion.

Religion
No later than AD256, the town was the seat of a Christian bishop. The diocese was in abeyance after the Muslim conquest of the region until it was restored by the Roman Catholic Church in 1933 as a titular bishopric.

List of bishops 

 Cassius, at the council of Carthage called in 256 by Saint Cyprianus to discuss the 'lapsed' Christians who preferred forced idolatry to martyrdom
 Donatus, mentioned after 406, praised by Saint Augustine of Hippo in Contra Cresconium for abjuring the heresy Donatism
 Aurelius participated in the 411 council of Carthage (where both Catholic and heretical bishops were invited) as well as his Donatist counterpart from Macomades, Sallustius 
 Pardalius was exiled after participating in the 484 synod of Carthage, called by the Vandal king Huneric, an Arian; in 487 he parttook, probably as Numidian delegate, in Pope Felix III's Lateran Council.
 Florentino Armas Lerena (8 April 1967 25 November 1979), while first Bishop-Prelate of Territorial Prelature of Chota and still on emeritate
 Ricardo Watty Urquidi (27 May 1980 6 November 1989), as Auxiliary Bishop of Mexico City, later Bishop of Nuevo Laredo, Bishop of Tepic
 Francisco Clavel Gil (from 27 June 2001), emeritus as former Auxiliary Bishop emeritus of Mexico City

See also 
 List of Catholic dioceses in Algeria

References

Citations

Bibliography

 .
 .

Phoenician colonies in Algeria
Catholic titular sees in Africa